Dave Richard Bassett is an American songwriter and record producer. Originally from Chicago, a Deerfield High School graduate, Bassett relocated to Los Angeles to pursue a musical career after a chance on-stage performance with U2.

Career
Bassett has worked in various genres, writing and producing music for artists such as alternative acts Elle King, Vance Joy, Bishop Briggs, Alice Merton, Fitz and the Tantrums and Walk off the Earth to rock acts Shinedown, Pop Evil and Halestorm to mainstream names such as Rachel Platten, Josh Groban, Idina Menzel and Daughtry.

Notable music credits
Produced and co-written by Bassett, "Ex's & Oh's" is certified double Platinum in the United States, Australia and Canada. "Ex's & Oh's" charted in multiple formats in the US and across the world including US Billboard Hot 100, US Adult Alternative Songs (Billboard), US Adult Top 40 (Billboard), US Alternative Songs (Billboard), US Hot Rock Songs (Billboard), US Rock Airplay (Billboard). "Ex's & Oh's" received two nominations at the 58th Grammy Awards: Best Rock Performance and Best Rock Song.

The Rachel Platten song "Fight Song" has sold three million copies in the United States, earned a triple Platinum certification by the RIAA and reached number six on the Billboard Hot 100 charts and number one on the Adult Contemporary and Adult Pop Songs radio charts. "Fight Song" also topped charts in the UK, Australia, Canada and New Zealand.

"Fight Song" was used extensively during Hillary Clinton's run for presidency in 2016 and became the campaign's unofficial anthem. A star-studded celebrity a cappella version of the song featuring Elizabeth Banks, Mandy Moore, Aisha Tyler, America Ferrarra, Jane Fonda and many aired at the Democratic National Convention and the video went viral on social media.

In 2018, Bassett produced seven songs on Vance Joy's Nation of Two LP including the co-written Gold Certified tracks "Lay It on Me" and "Saturday Sun." He also co-produced and co-wrote the singles "White Flag" for Bishop Briggs and Alice Merton's "Lash Out."

In 2019, Bassett co-wrote the hit single "All My Friends" by The Revivalists as well as Shinedown's #1 single "Attention Attention".

In 2020 Bassett co-wrote "Hero" by Weezer with Rivers Cuomo which went to #1 at Alternative radio.

Dave Not Dave
In 2016, Bassett started a band called Dave Not Dave whose song "Cold Blood" was featured in The Royals and Suits.

Film, television and advertising
Bassett's scores and songs have appeared in national spots for the likes of Toyota, Target, T-Mobile, Dunkin' Donuts, Google, Nissan, Victoria's Secret, Best Buy, FIFA, the Olympics, as well as film and TV shows including The Royals, Suits, Grey's Anatomy, Nashville, Royal Pains, CSI: Miami, and films such as Sing, Annie, Runaway Bride, Muppets Most Wanted and Bridge to Terabithia.

Some notable film songs include:

Composer for "Set it All Free" from the movie Sing featuring vocals by Scarlett Johansson.

Co-writer, co-producer for "How a Heart Unbreaks" from Pitch Perfect 3.

Co-writer for Elle King's "Good Girls" from 2016's Ghostbusters Original Motion Picture Soundtrack.

Co-writer for "Smile" from the 2014 release of Annie performed by Rachel Platten.

Awards
In 2016, Bassett was nominated for two Grammy Awards for Best Rock Song and Best Rock Performance for co-writing and producing Elle King's "Ex's & Oh's".

Bassett won two ASCAP Pop Awards in 2016 with Rachel Platten's Fight Song and Elle King's "Ex's & Oh's". Bassett won a second ASCAP Pop Award for "Ex's and Oh's" in 2017.

In 2013 Halestorm won a Grammy "Best Hard Rock/Metal Performance" with their song “Love Bites” co-written by Bassett.

In 2010 Bassett won an ASCAP Pop Award for co-writing Shinedown's "Second Chance" and in 2011 for Shinedown's  "If You Only Knew".

References

American male songwriters
Record producers from Illinois
Living people
Year of birth missing (living people)